is a Japanese footballer who plays as a goalkeeper for Tochigi City FC.

Career statistics

Club
.

References

External links

1998 births
Living people
Association football people from Iwate Prefecture
Biwako Seikei Sport College alumni
Japanese footballers
Japan youth international footballers
Association football goalkeepers
J3 League players
Kataller Toyama players
Iwaki FC players
Tochigi City FC players